Cyanide poisoning is poisoning that results from exposure to any of a number of forms of cyanide. Early symptoms include headache, dizziness, fast heart rate, shortness of breath, and vomiting. This phase may then be followed by seizures, slow heart rate, low blood pressure, loss of consciousness, and cardiac arrest. Onset of symptoms usually occurs within a few minutes. Some survivors have long-term neurological problems.

Toxic cyanide-containing compounds include hydrogen cyanide gas and a number of cyanide salts. Poisoning is relatively common following breathing in smoke from a house fire. Other potential routes of exposure include workplaces involved in metal polishing, certain insecticides, the medication sodium nitroprusside, and certain seeds such as those of apples and apricots. Liquid forms of cyanide can be absorbed through the skin. Cyanide ions interfere with cellular respiration, resulting in the body's tissues being unable to use oxygen.

Diagnosis is often difficult. It may be suspected in a person following a house fire who has a decreased level of consciousness, low blood pressure, or high lactic acid. Blood levels of cyanide can be measured but take time. Levels of 0.5–1 mg/L are mild, 1–2 mg/L are moderate, 2–3 mg/L are severe, and greater than 3 mg/L generally result in death.

If exposure is suspected, the person should be removed from the source of the exposure and decontaminated. Treatment involves supportive care and giving the person 100% oxygen. Hydroxocobalamin (vitamin B12a) appears to be useful as an antidote and is generally first-line. Sodium thiosulphate may also be given. Historically, cyanide has been used for mass suicide and it was used for genocide by the Nazis.

Signs and symptoms

Acute exposure
If hydrogen cyanide is inhaled, it can cause a coma with seizures, apnea, and cardiac arrest, with death following in a matter of seconds.  At lower doses, loss of consciousness may be preceded by general weakness, dizziness, headaches, vertigo, confusion, and perceived difficulty in breathing. At the first stages of unconsciousness, breathing is often sufficient or even rapid, although the state of the person progresses towards a deep coma, sometimes accompanied by pulmonary edema, and finally cardiac arrest. A cherry red skin color that darkens may be present as the result of increased venous hemoglobin oxygen saturation. Despite the similar name, cyanide does not directly cause cyanosis. A fatal dose for humans can be as low as 1.5 mg/kg body weight.  Other sources claim a lethal dose is 1–3 mg per kg body weight for vertebrates.

Chronic exposure
Exposure to lower levels of cyanide over a long period (e.g., after use of improperly processed cassava roots, which are a primary food source in tropical Africa) results in increased blood cyanide levels, which can result in weakness and a variety of symptoms, including permanent paralysis, nervous lesions, hypothyroidism, and miscarriages. Other effects include mild liver and kidney damage.

Causes

Cyanide poisoning can result from the ingestion of cyanide salts; imbibing pure liquid prussic acid; skin absorption of prussic acid; intravenous infusion of nitroprusside for hypertensive crisis; or the inhalation of hydrogen cyanide gas. The last typically occurs through one of three mechanisms:

 The gas is directly released from canisters (e.g. as part of a pesticide, insecticide, or Zyklon B).
 It is generated on site by reacting potassium cyanide or sodium cyanide with sulfuric acid (e.g. in a modern American gas chamber).
 Fumes arise during a building fire or any similar scenario involving the burning of polyurethane, vinyl or other polymer products that required nitriles in their production.

As potential contributing factors, cyanide is present in:

 Tobacco smoke.
 Many seeds or kernels such as those of almonds, apricots, apples, oranges, and flaxseed.
 Foods including cassava (also known as tapioca, yuca or manioc) and bamboo shoots.

As a potential harm-reduction factor, Vitamin B12, in the form of hydroxocobalamin (also spelled hydroxycobalamin), might reduce the negative effects of chronic exposure; whereas, a deficiency might worsen negative health effects following exposure to cyanide.

Mechanism
Cyanide is a potent cytochrome c oxidase (COX, a.k.a. Complex IV) inhibitor. As such, cyanide poisoning is a form of histotoxic hypoxia, because it interferes with oxidative phosphorylation.

Specifically, cyanide binds to the heme a3-CuB binuclear center of COX (and thus is a non-competitive inhibitor of it). This prevents electrons passing through COX from being transferred to O2, which not only blocks the mitochondrial electron transport chain, it also interferes with the pumping of a proton out of the mitochondrial matrix which would otherwise occur at this stage. Therefore, cyanide interferes not only with aerobic respiration but also with the ATP synthesis pathway it facilitates, owing to the close relationship between those two processes.

One antidote for cyanide poisoning, nitrite (i.e. via amyl nitrite), works by converting ferrohemoglobin to ferrihemoglobin, which can then compete with COX for free cyanide (as the cyanide will bind to the iron in its heme groups instead). Ferrihemoglobin cannot carry oxygen, but the amount of ferrihemoglobin that can be formed without impairing oxygen transport is much greater than the amount of COX in the body.

Cyanide is a broad-spectrum poison because the reaction it inhibits is essential to aerobic metabolism; COX is found in many forms of life. However, susceptibility to cyanide is far from uniform across affected species; for instance, plants have an alternative electron transfer pathway available that passes electrons directly from ubiquinone to O2, which confers cyanide resistance by bypassing COX.

Diagnosis

Lactate is produced by anaerobic glycolysis when oxygen concentration becomes too low for the normal aerobic respiration pathway. Cyanide poisoning inhibits aerobic respiration and therefore increases anaerobic glycolysis which causes a rise of lactate in the plasma. A lactate concentration above 10 mmol per liter is an indicator of cyanide poisoning, as defined by the presence of a blood cyanide concentration above 40 µmol per liter. Lactate levels greater than 6 mmol/L after reported or strongly suspected pure cyanide poisoning, such as cyanide-containing smoke exposure, suggests significant cyanide exposure.

Methods of detection include colorimetric assays such as the Prussian blue test, the pyridine-barbiturate assay, also known as the "Conway diffusion method" and the taurine fluorescence-HPLC but like all colorimetric assays these are prone to false positives. Lipid peroxidation resulting in "TBARS," an artifact of heart attack produces dialdehydes that cross-react with the pyridine-barbiturate assay.  Meanwhile, the taurine-fluorescence-HPLC assay used for cyanide detection is identical to the assay used to detect glutathione in spinal fluid.

Cyanide and thiocyanate assays have been run with mass spectrometry (LC/MS/MS), which are considered specific tests. Since cyanide has a short half-life, the main metabolite, thiocyanate is typically measured to determine exposure. Other methods of detection include the identification of plasma lactate.

Treatment

Decontamination
Decontamination of people exposed to hydrogen cyanide gas only requires removal of the outer clothing and the washing of their hair. Those exposed to liquids or powders generally require full decontamination.

Antidote
The International Programme on Chemical Safety issued a survey (IPCS/CEC Evaluation of Antidotes Series) that lists the following antidotal agents and their effects: oxygen, sodium thiosulfate, amyl nitrite, sodium nitrite, 4-dimethylaminophenol, hydroxocobalamin, and dicobalt edetate ('Kelocyanor'), as well as several others. Other commonly-recommended antidotes are 'solutions A and B' (a solution of ferrous sulfate in aqueous citric acid, and aqueous sodium carbonate, respectively) and amyl nitrite.

The United States standard cyanide antidote kit first uses a small inhaled dose of amyl nitrite, followed by intravenous sodium nitrite, followed by intravenous sodium thiosulfate. Hydroxocobalamin was approved for use in the US in late 2006 and is available in Cyanokit antidote kits. Sulfanegen TEA, which could be delivered to the body through an intra-muscular (IM) injection, detoxifies cyanide and converts the cyanide into thiocyanate, a less toxic substance. Alternative methods of treating cyanide intoxication are used in other countries.

The Irish Health and Safety Executive (HSE) has recommended against the use of solutions A and B because of their limited shelf life, potential to cause iron poisoning, and limited applicability (effective only in cases of cyanide ingestion, whereas the main modes of poisoning are inhalation and skin contact). The HSE has also questioned the usefulness of amyl nitrite due to storage/availability problems, risk of abuse, and lack of evidence of significant benefits. It also states that the availability of kelocyanor at the workplace may mislead doctors into treating a patient for cyanide poisoning when this is an erroneous diagnosis. The HSE no longer recommends a particular cyanide antidote.

History

Fires

The República Cromañón nightclub fire broke out in Buenos Aires, Argentina on 30 December 2004, killing 194 people and leaving at least 1,492 injured. Most of the victims died from inhaling poisonous gases, and carbon monoxide. After the fire, the technical institution INTI found that the level of toxicity due to the materials and volume of the building was 225 ppm of cyanide in the air. A lethal dose for rats is between 150 ppm and 220 ppm, meaning the air in the building was highly toxic.

On 5 December 2009, a fire in the night club Lame Horse (Khromaya Loshad) in the Russian city of Perm took the lives of 156 people. Fatalities consisted of 111 people at the site and 45 later in hospitals. One of the main causes of death was poisoning from cyanide and other toxic gases released by the burning of plastic and polyurethane foam used in the construction of club interiors. Taking into account the number of deaths, this was the largest fire in post-Soviet Russia.

On 27 January 2013, a fire at the Kiss nightclub in the city of Santa Maria, in the south of Brazil, caused the poisoning of hundreds of young people by cyanide released by the combustion of soundproofing foam made with polyurethane. By March 2013, 245 fatalities were confirmed.

Gas chambers

In early 1942, Zyklon B, which contains hydrogen cyanide, emerged as the preferred killing tool of Nazi Germany for use in extermination camps during the Holocaust. The chemical was used to murder roughly one million people in gas chambers installed in extermination camps at Auschwitz-Birkenau, Majdanek, and elsewhere. Most of the people who were murdered were Jews, and by far the majority of these murders took place at Auschwitz. Zyklon B was supplied to concentration camps at Mauthausen, Dachau, and Buchenwald by the distributor Heli, and to Auschwitz and Majdanek by Testa. Camps also occasionally bought Zyklon B directly from the manufacturers. Of the 729 tonnes of Zyklon B sold in Germany in 1942–44, 56 tonnes (about eight percent of domestic sales) were sold to concentration camps. Auschwitz received 23.8 tonnes, of which six tonnes were used for fumigation. The remainder was used in the gas chambers or lost to spoilage (the product had a stated shelf life of only three months). Testa conducted fumigations for the Wehrmacht and supplied them with Zyklon B. They also offered courses to the SS in the safe handling and use of the material for fumigation purposes. In April 1941, the German agriculture and interior ministries designated the SS as an authorized applier of the chemical, and thus they were able to use it without any further training or governmental oversight.

Hydrogen cyanide gas has been used for judicial execution in some states of the United States, where cyanide was generated by reaction between potassium cyanide (or sodium cyanide) dropped into a compartment containing sulfuric acid, directly below the chair in the gas chamber.

Suicide

Cyanide salts are sometimes used as fast-acting suicide devices. Cyanide reacts at a higher level with high stomach acidity.

On 26 January 1904, company promoter and swindler Whitaker Wright died by suicide by ingesting cyanide in a court anteroom immediately after being convicted of fraud.
 In February 1937, the Uruguayan short story writer Horacio Quiroga died by suicide by drinking cyanide in a hospital at Buenos Aires.
 In 1937, polymer chemist Wallace Carothers died by suicide by cyanide.
 In the 1943 Operation Gunnerside to destroy the Vemork Heavy Water Plant in World War II (an attempt to stop or slow German atomic bomb progress), the commandos were given cyanide tablets (cyanide enclosed in rubber) kept in the mouth and were instructed to bite into them in case of German capture. The tablets ensured death within three minutes.
 Cyanide, in the form of pure liquid prussic acid (a historical name for hydrogen cyanide), was the favored suicide agent of Nazi Germany. Erwin Rommel (1944), Adolf Hitler's wife, Eva Braun (1945), and Nazi leaders Heinrich Himmler (1945), possibly Martin Bormann (1945), and Hermann Göring (1946) all died by suicide by ingesting it.
 It is speculated that, in 1954, Alan Turing used an apple that had been injected with a solution of cyanide to die by suicide after being convicted of having a homosexual relationship, which was illegal at the time in the United Kingdom, and forced to undergo hormonal castration to avoid prison. An inquest determined that Turing's death from cyanide poisoning was a suicide, although this has been disputed.
 Members of the Sri Lankan Tamil (or Eelam Tamil) LTTE (Liberation Tigers of Tamil Eelam, whose insurgency lasted from 1983 to 2009), used to wear cyanide vials around their necks with the intention of dying by suicide if captured by the government forces.
 On 22 June 1977, Moscow, Aleksandr Dmitrievich Ogorodnik, a Soviet diplomat accused of spying on behalf of the Colombian Intelligence Agency and the US Central Intelligence Agency, was arrested. During the interrogations, Ogorodnik offered to write a full confession and asked for his pen. Inside the pen cap was a cleverly hidden cyanide pill, which when bitten on, caused Ogorodnik to die before he hit the floor, according to the Soviets.
 On 18 November 1978, Jonestown. A total of 909 individuals died in Jonestown, many from apparent cyanide poisoning, in an event termed "revolutionary suicide" by Jones and some members on an audio tape of the event and in prior discussions. The poisonings in Jonestown followed the murder of five others by Temple members at Port Kaituma, including United States Congressman Leo Ryan, an act that Jones ordered. Four other Temple members died by murder-suicide in Georgetown at Jones' command.
 On 6 June 1985, serial killer Leonard Lake died in custody after having ingested cyanide pills he had sewn into his clothes. 
 On 28 June 2012, Wall Street trader Michael Marin ingested a cyanide pill seconds after a guilty verdict was read in his arson trial in Phoenix, AZ; he died minutes after.
 On 22 June 2015, John B. McLemore, a horologist and the central figure of the podcast S-Town, died after ingesting cyanide.
 On 29 November 2017, Slobodan Praljak died from drinking potassium cyanide, after being convicted of war crimes by the International Criminal Tribunal for the former Yugoslavia.

Mining and industrial
In 1993, an illegal spill resulted in the death of seven people in Avellaneda, Argentina. In their memory, the National Environmental Conscious Day (Día Nacional de la Conciencia Ambiental) was established.
In 2000, a spill at Baia Mare, Romania, resulted in the worst environmental disaster in Europe since Chernobyl.
In 2000, Allen Elias, CEO of Evergreen Resources was convicted of knowing endangerment for his role in the cyanide poisoning of employee Scott Dominguez. This was one of the first successful criminal prosecutions of a corporate executive by the Environmental Protection Agency.

Murder
 John Tawell, a murderer who in 1845 became the first person to be arrested as the result of telecommunications technology. 
 Grigori Rasputin (1916; attempted, later killed by gunshot)
 The Goebbels children (1945)
 Stepan Bandera (1959)
 Jonestown, Guyana, was the site of a large mass murder–suicide, in which over 900 members of the Peoples Temple drank potassium cyanide–laced Flavor Aid in 1978.
 Chicago Tylenol murders (1982)
 Timothy Marc O'Bryan (1966–1974) died on October 31, 1974 by ingesting potassium cyanide placed into a giant Pixy Stix. His father, Ronald Clark O'Bryan, was  convicted of Tim's murder plus four counts of attempted murder. O'Bryan put potassium cyanide into five giant Pixy Stix that he gave to his son and daughter along with three other children. Only Timothy ate the poisoned candy and died.
 Bruce Nickell (5 June 1986) Murdered by his wife who poisoned a bottle of Excedrin. 
 Richard Kuklinski (1935–2006)
 Janet Overton (1942–1988) Her husband, Richard Overton was convicted of poisoning her, but Janet's symptoms did not match those of classic cyanide poisoning, the timeline was inconsistent with cyanide poisoning, and the amount found was just a trace. The diagnostic method used was prone to false positives. Richard Overton died in prison in 2009.
 Urooj Khan (1966–2012), won the lottery and was found dead a few days later. A blood diagnostic reported a lethal level of cyanide in his blood, but the body did not display any classic symptoms of cyanide poisoning, and no link to cyanide could be found in Urooj's social circle.  The diagnostic method used was the Conway diffusion method, prone to false positives with artifacts of heart attack and kidney failure. 
 Autumn Marie Klein (20 April 2013), a prominent 41-year-old neuroscientist and physician, died from cyanide poisoning. Klein's husband, Robert J. Ferrante, also a prominent neuroscientist who used cyanide in his research, was convicted of murder and sentenced to life in prison for her death. Robert Ferrante is appealing his conviction.
 Mirna Salihin died in hospital on 6 January 2016, after drinking a Vietnamese iced coffee at a cafe in a shopping mall in Jakarta. Police reports claim that cyanide poisoning was the most likely cause of her death.
 Jolly Thomas of Kozhikode, Kerala, India, was arrested in 2019 for the murder of 6 family members. Murders took place over 14-year period and each victim ate a meal prepared by the killer. The murders were allegedly motivated by wanting control of the family finances and property.
 Mei Xiang Li of Brooklyn, NY, collapsed and died in April 2017, with cyanide later reported to be in her blood. However, Mei never exhibited symptoms of cyanide poisoning and no link to cyanide could be found in her life.

Warfare or terrorism

 In 1988, between 3,200 and 5,000 people died in the Halabja massacre owing to unknown chemical nerve agents. Hydrogen cyanide gas was strongly suspected. 
 In 1995, a device was discovered in a restroom in the Kayabacho Tokyo subway station, consisting of bags of sodium cyanide and sulfuric acid with a remote controlled motor to rupture them in what was believed to be an attempt by the Aum Shinrikyo cult to produce toxic amounts of hydrogen cyanide gas.
 In 2003, Al Qaeda reportedly planned to release cyanide gas into the New York City Subway system. The attack was supposedly aborted because there would not be enough casualties.

Research
Cobinamide is the final compound in the biosynthesis of cobalamin. It has greater affinity for the cyanide than cobalamin itself, which suggests that it could be a better option for emergency treatment.

See also
 Anaerobic glycolysis
 Lactic acidosis
 List of poisonings
 Konzo

References

Explanatory notes

Citations

Sources
 
 
 

Cyanides
Neurotoxins
Wikipedia medicine articles ready to translate
Wikipedia emergency medicine articles ready to translate
Toxic effects of substances chiefly nonmedicinal as to source